Saint-Pierre-du-Perray is a commune in the Essonne department in Île-de-France in northern France.

Population
Inhabitants of Saint-Pierre-du-Perray are known as Saint-Perreyens.

See also
Communes of the Essonne department

References

External links

Official website 
Mayors of Essonne Association 

Communes of Essonne
Sénart